The Silver Palm was a daily passenger train route operated by Amtrak between Miami and Tampa in the U.S. state of Florida. Service began in 1982 and ended in 1985.

From 1996 to 2002, Amtrak reused the Silver Palm name to rebrand its New York–Miami Palmetto route under the Silver Service banner.

History 

Amtrak introduced the first Silver Palm as a single round trip service between Miami and Tampa, Florida, on November 21, 1982. The train was subsidized by the Florida Department of Transportation as a 403(b) service. The train operated over the tracks of the Seaboard System Railroad between Miami and Tampa via Auburndale. The northbound train departed Miami in the morning and returned from Tampa in the afternoon. Travel time was approximately five hours in each direction. It followed the traditional SAL mainline through Wildwood and Ocala in north-central Florida. 

The Silver Palm was the first intrastate train to use the then-new Amfleet II coaches. The initial consist was two coaches and a cafe car.

During its service, train crew were required to manually throw switches for the train to operate between divisions. Amtrak had worked to remove speed restrictions on the line and considered adding more stops in an effort to improve service and increase the train's profitability. The state also tried to help boost ridership following a publicity tour by then Lieutenant Governor Wayne Mixson in August 1984, in part to build a base of riders for proposed high-speed service in the state. After a two-year trial the Florida Department of Transportation recommended ending subsidies for the Silver Palm. State law required that state-sponsored services maintain a farebox ratio of 60% to continue funding. 

FDOT announced on October 20, 1984 that the Silver Palm'''s ratio was 45.3%. The service was scheduled to be discontinued on November 20, 1984. The Florida Coalition of Rail Passengers sued the state, arguing that the Department of Transportation had calculated the operating ratio incorrectly, and won at the district court level. This decision was overturned on appeal by the Florida First District Court of Appeal on March 28, 1985. The Silver Palm was discontinued on April 30, 1985.   It was estimated to have cost $4 million over the course of its run.

 Revived name 

The second Silver Palm was a long-distance passenger train between New York, New York, and Miami, Florida. This was a revival of the Palmetto, which Amtrak had discontinued on April 1, 1995. Service began on November 10, 1996. For a period in the mid-1990s, as in the 1996-1997 season, it was Amtrak's only train passing through Ocala area north-central Florida section in 1996. Amtrak restored the Palmetto name on May 1, 2002, after the train lost sleeping and dining car service.

 See also PalmettoSilver Service''

References

External links 

1984 timetable

Former Amtrak routes
Passenger rail transportation in Florida
Railway services introduced in 1982
Railway services discontinued in 1985